Bob O'Dekirk (born 1969/70) is the mayor of Joliet, Illinois. He was sworn in on May 4, 2015. O'Dekirk is a former Joliet police officer and is a practicing attorney in Joliet.

Education
O'Dekirk descends from Canaryville Irish in Chicago. He graduated in 1987 from Oak Forest High School, where he boxed and played football and baseball; in 1987 he was named All-Conference in baseball. He earned an undergraduate degree in 1991 from the University of Illinois and his degree in law in 2003 from the John Marshall Law School.

Career
Beginning in 1993 he worked for ten years as a uniformed and plainclothes officer for the Joliet police, winning the Martin S. Murrin Labor Award in 1995 and serving on the executive board of the local affiliate of the Fraternal Order of Police. After earning his law degree, he became an Assistant Corporate Counsel for the city of Chicago and worked on a task force prosecuting narcotics crimes. In 2006 he returned to Joliet and went into private practice.

In 2008–2009, he worked with the Department of State assisting in training police in Iraq. On his return to the US, he became a partner in the law firm of O’Dekirk, Allred & Associates.

O'Dekirk was elected to the Joliet City Council in 2011. and was elected mayor in 2015, unseating Tom Giarrante. He is also the city's liquor commissioner. His slogan as a mayoral candidate was "Joliet Can Be Great Again"; as mayor, he has emphasized conservative budgeting and economic development to make up for recent losses of employment and reduction in income from riverboat casinos.

Controversy
During his time employed as a law enforcement officer for the Joliet Police Department, O'Dekirk allegedly faced seven suspensions totaling forty-nine days as punishment stemming from undisclosed actions.

On May 31, 2020, O'Dekirk assaulted two Black Lives Matter protestors on Jefferson Street in Joliet. Videos of the incident, which became viral shortly thereafter, display O'Dekirk grab a protestor's neck with both hands, push him behind a police vehicle, and throw him to the ground. In response to public outrage from the assault, O'Dekirk, who was not employed as a police officer at the time, claimed to have used "standard police tactics" to immobilize the protestor. The City of Joliet paid $93,000 to the two victims of the assault in out-of-court settlements.

Private life
O'Dekirk is married, and the couple has a blended family of three children.

References

External links
 Mayor O'Dekirk's bio on the City of Joilet's website

20th-century births
Year of birth uncertain
Living people
American police officers
Mayors of Joliet, Illinois
21st-century American politicians
University of Illinois alumni
1969 births
John Marshall Law School (Chicago) alumni